Nalli is an Indian wardrobe store and silk saree emporium based in Chennai. It is one of the oldest saree shops in the Chennai's commercial neighbourhood of T. Nagar.

History 
Nalli was established in T. Nagar in 1928 by Nalli Chinnasamy Chetti, a weaver who belonged to the Padmasaliyar community. Chinnasamy Chetti was a famous weaver of Kanchipuram sarees who had been weaving silk sarees since 1900 and gifted a Kanchipuram saree, the Durbar Pet, as a souvenir to George V during his visit to India in 1911. In 1928, he moved to the then Madras and became one of the first to open a shop in the neighbourhood of T. Nagar which was founded in the early 1920s.  The shop initially functioned from a house until Nalli established his own showroom in 1935. Nalli Chinnasamy Chetti died in 1958 and was succeeded by his grandson Nalli Kuppusamy Chetti.

Notes

External links 
 

Retailing in Chennai
Retail companies of India
Clothing brands of India
Companies based in Chennai
Indian companies established in 1928
Retail companies established in 1928